Aris Nukić (born 21 December 1993) is a German former professional footballer who played as a striker or attacking midfielder. Nukić lasted played for FK Olimpic Sarajevo where he played a part in claiming the first ever Bosnian Cup in the club's history.

Early life 
Nukic was born in Tübingen, Germany, on 21 December 1993 to Bosnian parents. Nukić began playing at the age of five after his parents emigrated to the United States. While growing up in St. Louis, Missouri, Nukić attended Lindenwood University, where he received NCAA First Team All-American honors as a sophomore. The All-American honor was the first in the program's history at the NCAA level.

Professional 
Nukić signed for FK Olimpik Sarajevo in June 2014. Nukić was a part of the historic first ever Bosnia and Herzegovina Football Cup winning team in 2015.

References 

FK Olimpik players
Lindenwood University alumni
American people of Bosnia and Herzegovina descent
Bosnian-American culture in Missouri
1993 births
Sportspeople from Tübingen
Lindenwood Lions men's soccer players
Soccer players from St. Louis
Living people
Association football forwards
American soccer players
German emigrants to the United States
Footballers from Baden-Württemberg